Deian Boldor (born 3 February 1995) is a Romanian professional footballer who plays as a defender for Liga I club Chindia Târgoviște.

Club 
On 20 July 2017, Boldor was loaned to Montreal Impact of Major League Soccer. He left the Canadian side on 18 January 2018.

Hellas Verona
In July 2018, Boldor penned a 4-year deal with Hellas Verona for a reported transfer fee of €2 million. Just a month later, on 17 August 2018, Boldor was loaned to fellow Serie B side Foggia, until 30 June 2019, in order to get more playing time. On 24 July 2019 he was loaned to Partizani Tirana in Albania.

Return to Romania
On 28 January 2021 he joined Argeș Pitești.

Personal life
He is of Serb descent.

References

External links 
 
 

1995 births
Living people
Romanian footballers
Association football defenders
Romania youth international footballers
Romania under-21 international footballers
Romanian people of Serbian descent
Serie A players
Serie B players
Serie C players
A.S. Roma players
Delfino Pescara 1936 players
S.S. Virtus Lanciano 1924 players
Hellas Verona F.C. players
Calcio Foggia 1920 players
FK Partizani Tirana players
Potenza Calcio players
FC Argeș Pitești players
AFC Chindia Târgoviște players
Romanian expatriate footballers
Expatriate footballers in Italy
Expatriate soccer players in Canada
Expatriate footballers in Albania
Romanian expatriate sportspeople in Italy
Romanian expatriate sportspeople in Canada
Romanian expatriate sportspeople in Albania
CF Montréal players
Major League Soccer players
Kategoria Superiore players
Sportspeople from Timișoara